Site most often refers to:

 Archaeological site
 Campsite, a place used for overnight stay in an outdoor area
 Construction site
 Location, a point or an area on the Earth's surface or elsewhere
 Website, a set of related web pages, typically with a common domain name

It may also refer to:

 Site, a National Register of Historic Places property type
 SITE (originally known as Sculpture in the Environment), an American architecture and design firm
 Site (mathematics), a category C together with a Grothendieck topology on C
 The Site, a 1990s TV series that aired on MSNBC
 SITE Intelligence Group, a for-profit organization tracking jihadist and white supremacist organizations
 SITE Institute, a terrorism-tracking organization, precursor to the SITE Intelligence Group
 Sindh Industrial and Trading Estate, a company in Sindh, Pakistan
 SITE Centers, American commercial real estate company
 SITE Town, a densely populated town in Karachi, Pakistan
 S.I.T.E Industrial Area, an area in Karachi, Pakistan
 Satellite Instructional Television Experiment, an experimental satellite communications project launched in India in 1975
 Google Sites, web based website editor

See also
 Sites, California